Attila Kovács (30 December 1939 – 10 November 2010) was a Hungarian fencer. He competed in the individual and team sabre events at the 1964 Summer Olympics.

References

External links
 

1939 births
2010 deaths
Hungarian male sabre fencers
Olympic fencers of Hungary
Fencers at the 1964 Summer Olympics
Martial artists from Budapest
Universiade medalists in fencing
Universiade bronze medalists for Hungary
Medalists at the 1959 Summer Universiade
Medalists at the 1965 Summer Universiade